Payne is an unincorporated community in McClain County, Oklahoma, United States. It is located on State Highway 59.

References

Unincorporated communities in McClain County, Oklahoma
Unincorporated communities in Oklahoma